The following list is a comparison of basic Proto-Slavic vocabulary and the corresponding reflexes in the modern languages, for assistance in understanding the discussion in Proto-Slavic and History of the Slavic languages.  The word list is based on the Swadesh word list, developed by the linguist Morris Swadesh, a tool to study the evolution of languages via comparison, containing a set of 207 basic words which can be found in every language and are rarely borrowed. However, the words given as the modern versions are not necessarily the normal words with the given meaning in the various modern languages, but the words directly descended from the corresponding Proto-Slavic word (the reflex). The list here is given both in the orthography of each language, with accent marks added as necessary to aid in pronunciation and Proto-Slavic reconstruction. See below for a capsule summary of how to pronounce each language, as well as some discussion of the conventions used.

Table

Conventions in the table 
 Common Slavic accents follow Chakavian conventions: ã (long rising), à (short rising), ȃ (long falling), ȁ (short falling), ā (length in unstressed syllable).
The accent pattern (a, b or c) of Common Slavic nouns, verbs and adjectives is indicated. These patterns are as follows: a = consistent root accent; b = predominant suffix accent; c = mobile accent.
Nouns are given in the nominative singular; a form in parentheses is genitive singular except as indicated (acc. = accusative singular, pl. = nominative plural).
Verbs are given in the infinitive (but the first singular present in Bulgarian, which has no infinitives). A form in parentheses is first singular present except as indicated (2sg. = second singular, 3sg. = third singular). A second form in parentheses is third singular present.
When multiple forms of an adjective are given, the order is masculine, feminine, neuter.
Chakavian forms are given in the Vrgada dialect except as indicated (Novi = Novi dialect, Orb. = Orbanići dialect).

Transcription of Russian and Bulgarian 
Transcription of Bulgarian follows the standard conventions for academic transliteration of Cyrillic, with the exception that Cyrillic ъ is represented as ǝ instead of ă for ease of reading, particularly when combined with a stress mark (ǝ́ instead of ắ). This is a one-to-one transliteration that directly represents the spelling of Cyrillic. This transliteration also represents Bulgarian phonology quite well (unlike the situation in Russian).

Transcription of Russian is based on the same standard, but deviates from it in order to consistently represent palatalization (always written with a following apostrophe, e.g. l', n', t', v) and the phoneme /j/ (always written j), both of which are spelled in multiple ways in Cyrillic. The following indicates how to convert between the two:
{|class="wikitable"
! Cyrillic letters !! Letter class !! Academic transliteration !! This article's transcription
|-
! а э ы о у !! Non-palatal vowels
| a è y o u || a e y o u
|-
! я е и ё ю !! Palatal vowels
| ja e i ë ju || If following a consonant letter, a e i o u with preceding apostrophe ('); elsewhere, ja je ji jo ju.
|-
! й ў !! Semivowels
| j ŭ || same
|-
! ь !! Soft sign
| ' || same
|-
! ъ !! Hard sign
| '' || not written
|-
! щ !! A consonant sign
| šč || šš'''
|}

The result is that this article's transcription is almost directly phonemic, making it significantly easier for readers not familiar with the complications of Cyrillic spelling. Note that the transcription used here continues the standard practice of representing the Cyrillic letters ы и as y i, although they are normally considered allophones of each other.  This is because the pronunciation of the two letters is significantly different, and Russian ы normally continues Common Slavic *y , which was a separate phoneme.

The letter щ is conventionally written št in Bulgarian, šč in Russian. This article writes šš in Russian to reflect the modern pronunciation .

Both transcriptions indicate stress with an acute accent (á é í ó ú ý ǝ́). Stress is indicated in Cyrillic in the same fashion, except with the letter ё, which is always stressed.

 Pronunciation 

Capsule summary of Russian pronunciation

The transcription used in this article is morphophonemic rather than strictly phonemic, i.e. it writes the underlying phonemes rather than the phonemes actually heard when pronounced. The difference occurs particularly in the representation of unstressed vowels, where multiple underlying phonemes merge. For example, underlying e and i merge into the same sound when unstressed, but the difference is revealed in related forms based on the same root: e.g. z'eml'á  "land" has accusative z'éml'u , but z'imá  "winter" has accusative z'ímu . When the transcription (which is derived from the spelling) disagrees with the actual morphophonemic pronunciation, the latter is indicated specially, e.g. čto /što/; š'it' /šyt'/; ž'óltyj /žóltyj/; ž'ená /žená/ ; sólnc'e /sónce/ . This occurs mostly with the letters š, ž, c, which are normally written palatal but pronounced non-palatal; but it is also due to occasional assimilations. Note that the rules for unstressed vowels still need to be applied (see below).á, é, í etc. indicates stress.
 š , ž  and c  are never palatal, while č  and šš  are always palatal, regardless of spelling.y : allophone of i [i] after non-palatal consonants, but written differently by convention. Written i sounds as y after š, ž, c, regardless of whether indicated as palatal in the spelling: ž'it  "to live".
 Vowel mergers in unstressed syllables are extensive, but not written.
 After palatal, vowels a, o, e, i all merge as : t'až'ólyj  "heavy", v'el'ík'ij  "big".
 After non-palatal, vowels a and o merge as  directly before the stress and absolutely word-initially,  elsewhere: molokó  "milk", sobáka  "dog", č'elov'ék  "man (human)".
 After non-palatal, vowels e and i/y merge as : ž'ená .
 Exception: Absolutely word-finally after a palatal, e, i merge as  but a, o merge as : s'ém'a  "seed".
 Obstruents are devoiced word-finally, and agree in voicing in a cluster before another obstruent: muž  "husband", vs'o  "everything", vokzál  "railway station". But v does not trigger voicing of preceding obstruent, nor is it devoiced.
 The reflexive suffix -s'a and reflexive infinitive -t'-s'a are pronounced without palatalization, i.e. as if written -sa and -t-sa.

Capsule summary of Bulgarian pronunciationá, é, í etc. indicates stress.
Obstruent voicing/devoicing as in Russian.

Capsule summary of Czech pronunciationá, é, í etc. indicates vowel length.ů  < *ó. ou  < *ú.h , ch .č , š , ž , ř  (a palatal fricative trill, sounding a bit like ).ď , ť , ň . Also indicated by d, t, n before i, í or ě.y = i but indicates normal rather than palatal pronunciation after d t n.ě = short e but signals palatal nature of previous consonant: dě, tě, ně = ďe, ťe, ňe; vě, fě, bě, pě = ; mě = mňe.
Obstruent voicing/devoicing as in Russian. ř after obstruent is itself devoiced rather than trigger voicing: přímý  "straight".

Capsule summary of Polish pronunciation

Retroflex consonants: sz , cz , ż , rz  < *ř (as in Czech), dż .
Alveolopalatal consonants: ś or si , ć or ci , ź or zi , dź or dzi , ń or ni .
All consonants are palatalized before i. Note that alveolar s, z, n become alveolopalatal when palatalized, absorbing the i before another vowel: chodzić  "to walk", siedzieć  "to sit".h or ch , w , ł .y , ó  < *oː, ę , ą .
Obstruent voicing/devoicing as in Russian and Czech. However, w and rz do not voice a preceding voiceless obstruent, but instead are devoiced: kwiat  "flower", przyjść  "to come" < *prʲijtʲ (cf. Russian pr'ijt'í).

Capsule summary of Serbo-Croatian pronunciation

 Accents: á (long rising), à (short rising), ȃ (long falling), ȁ (short falling), ā (length in unstressed syllable), ã (long rising in Chakavian dialect = Common Slavic neoacute).
 š , č , ž , dž , ć , đ , nj , lj .
Russian-style obstruent voicing/devoicing does not occur.

Dialectal differentiation
After the three palatalizations of Proto-Slavic, dialectal variation became more apparent. Some dialects (such as Proto-East Slavic), applied the second regressive palatalization across an intervening *v.  
Russian: *gwojzda > *gwězda > zvězda >  ('star')
Polish: *gwojzda > *gwězda > gwiazda >  ('star')
Also, the realization of the palatalizations' sibilants varied a little amongst dialects.   argues that the phonetic character of the palatalizations was uniform throughout Common Slavic and that West Slavic languages developed *š later on by analogy.  In all dialects (except for Lechitic),  was deaffricated to :
Ukrainian: *zvizda> z'vizda; and zyrka/z'irka> Cf. Pol.: gwiazda-> GV/ZV + I + ZD; Z'/Z + Y/I + R + K +A ( zIr > vision).

The final cutoff point for the Proto-Slavic period was the change of *ě to *a after palatal consonants and *j, which then created *ča/*ka contrasts. This, and the shortening and elision of weak yers (*ь/ĭ and *ъ/ŭ) (see Havlík's law) that created newly formed closed syllables ended the period of syllabic synharmony characteristic of  Common Slavic.

For many Common Slavic dialects—including most of West Slavic, all but the northernmost portions of East Slavic, and some western parts of South Slavic— *g lenited from a voiced velar plosive to a voiced velar fricative ( > ).  Because this change was not universal and because it did not occur in a number of East Slavic dialects (such as Belarusian and South Russian) until after the application of Havlík's law,  calls into question early projections of this change and postulates three independent instigations of lenition, dating the earliest to before 900 AD and the latest to the early thirteenth century.

Because the reflexes for the nasal vowels *ę and *ǫ differ so widely, it's very likely that their phonetic value in Late Proto-Slavic was not uniform.

See also
Slavic languages
History of the Slavic languages
Proto-Slavic language
Indo-European vocabulary
Wiktionary:Appendix:Swadesh lists for Slavic languages
Slavic studies

References

Bibliography

 
 

Further reading
 BLAŽEK, Václav and NOVOTNÁ, Petra. "Glottochronology and its application to the Balto-Slavic languages". In: Baltistica''. 2007, vol. 42, No 2, p. 185-210. .

Slavic languages